"Can You Celebrate?" is Namie Amuro's seventh solo single under the Avex Trax label. Released on February 19, 1997, "Can You Celebrate" is the best-selling single by a solo female artist in Japanese music history, with sales of 2,296,200 copies.

It is also the theme song for Japanese drama  in 1997, which starred Emi Wakui, Tetsuya Takeda and Takashi Sorimachi. Namie Amuro herself appears in the opening sequence of the drama, along with Tetsuya Komuro on the piano.

Release 
Unique to Amuro's singles, the re-release was released in a hardpaper slipcase and pressed on a full-sized 5" disc instead of the then industry standard 3" disc. The cover utilizes images from her Concentration 20 (1997) album as well as images from her original "Can You Celebrate?" and "Dreaming I was dreaming" singles. Closeup shoots of Amuro clasping her hands together exposing her engagement ring are some of the only professional photographs of it that exist.

The single was re-released on December 25, 1997, as a maxi single to commemorate Amuro's marriage to Masaharu Maruyama (SAM). Featuring remixes of "Can You Celebrate?" as well as a remix of "Dreaming I Was Dreaming", the song charted as the first number one of 1998.

Track listings 
CD single
 "Can You Celebrate? (Straight Run)" (Tetsuya Komuro) – 6:17
 "Can You Celebrate? (Seventh Avenue South Mix)" (Tetsuya Komuro) – 8:43
 "Can You Celebrate? (Back Track with TK)" (Tetsuya Komuro) – 6:16

1997 re-released maxi single
 "Can You Celebrate? (Wedding Mix)" – 6:28
 "Dreaming I Was Dreaming (Subconscious Mix)" – 5:21
 "Can You Celebrate? (Heavenly Mix)" – 4:46
 "Can You Celebrate? (Wedding Mix - Instrumental)" – 6:28
 "Dreaming I Was Dreaming (Subconscious Mix - Instrumental) – 5:20

Personnel 
 Namie Amuro – vocals, background vocals
 Tetsuya Komuro – piano, background vocals
 Valerie Pinkerton-Background vocals
 Lynn Mabry-Background vocals
 Will Wheaton-Background vocals
 Kazuhiro Matsuo – guitar
 Producer – Tetsuya Komuro
 Arrangement – Tetsuya Komuro, Cozy Kubo
 String Arrangement – Randy Waldman
 Additional production – Robert Arbittier, Gary Adante
 Mixing – Dave Way
 Remixing – Joe Chiccarelli

TV performances 
February 4, 1997 – Utaban
February 9, 1997 – Super Jockey
February 10, 1997 – Hey! Hey! Hey! Music Champ
February 14, 1997 – Music Station
February 16, 1997 – Mega Hits Special
March 7, 1997 – Music Station
March 28, 1997 – Music Station Special
March 31, 1997 – Hey! Hey! Hey! Music Champ in Daiba
May 21, 1997 – TK Groove Museum Hong Kong
May 27, 1997 – TK Pan-Pacific Tour
October 3, 1997 – Music Station Special
November 16, 1997 – 1st The Japan Audition
November 28, 1997 – TK Groove Museum Beijing
December 11, 1997 – FNS Music Festival
December 26, 1997 – Music Station Special Super Live 1997
December 31, 1997 – 39th Japan Record Awards
December 31, 1997 – 48th Kōhaku Uta Gassen
December 31, 1998 – 49th Kōhaku Uta Gassen
December 27, 1999 – SMAP X SMAP
April 12, 2000 – Music Museum
December 2, 2000 – Love Love Aishiteru
March 30, 2001 – Music Station Special
December 6, 2001 – FNS Music Festival
December 25, 2001 – Eienteki Oto Raku Shounen
September 27, 2004 – Hey! Hey! Hey! Music Champ Special

Charts

Total Release (Original + Re-Release) 
Oricon Sales Chart (Japan)

Original CD release 
Oricon Sales Chart (Japan)

Maxi single re-release 
Oricon Sales Chart (Japan)

References
 Namie Amuro Discography Sampling Site

1997 singles
1997 songs
Namie Amuro songs
Oricon Weekly number-one singles
Japanese-language songs
Japanese television drama theme songs
Song recordings produced by Tetsuya Komuro
Songs written by Tetsuya Komuro
Avex Trax singles